Tamari may refer to:

 A type of soy sauce, produced mainly in the Chūbu region of Japan
 Dov Tamari (mathematician)
 Tamari lattice
 Dov Tamari (brigadier general)

See also
 Tammari (disambiguation)
 Temari (disambiguation)